Olaus Petriskolan is a Swedish school in Örebro. It is a public school that opened in 1908 under the name "Norra folkskolan". It was created by architect Carl Nissen. Its name was changed in 1925.

References

Buildings and structures in Örebro
Educational institutions established in 1908
Schools in Sweden
1908 establishments in Sweden
Public schools